Bigfoot and the Muscle Machines is a 1985 American animated TV mini-series that aired on the animated half-hour TV series Super Sunday and Super Saturday containing 9 segments that ran for 6 minutes each weekend, along with Jem, Robotix, and Inhumanoids. The segments were combined and turned into a 53-minute feature-length film. The series was based on SST (Super-Sized Trucks) Muscle Machines toy line by Playskool who in turn was owned by Hasbro.

This cartoon and the other Super Sunday cartoons were animated by Toei Animation in Japan. The show featured animated versions of vehicles popular in real life competing under the United States Hot Rod Association banner, including Bob Chandler's Bigfoot monster truck, Allen Gaines' Orange Blossom Special two-wheel-drive pulling truck, Kenneth and Paula Geuin's Black Gold four-wheel-drive pulling truck, and Dan Patrick's War Lord pulling funny car.

Plot
The story is about five people who run a public monster truck show led by Yank Justice, driver of Bigfoot. The other members of the show include Red & Redder (twin sisters who drive Black Gold), Professor Dee (driver of the Orange Blossom Special), and Close McCall (driver of War Lord). A young woman named Jennifer McGraw steals an ancient map that leads to the Fountain of Youth in Florida from an elderly corrupt billionaire named Adrian Ravenscroft, known as "Mr. Big". Ravenscroft hires a gang of henchmen who helped him try to get the map back; they include a man named Ernie Slye, as well as Ravenscroft's limousine chauffeur. This band of criminals chases Yank Justice and his friends across the United States and try to kill them.

In the end, Ravenscroft finds the Fountain and, after drinking its water, is turned into a young man, becoming a far more formidable opponent for Yank. But Yank and the others destroy the Fountain with their trucks, and Ravenscroft makes one final attempt to defeat Yank by trying to ram his limousine into Yank's truck; however, Yank is able to move out of the way, and Ravenscroft's car is destroyed when it careens out of control. Ravenscroft tries to flee, swearing revenge, but the effects of the Fountain wear off and he is quickly turned back into his elderly self and is unable to see that he is walking into an alligator-infested swamp, presumably meeting his fate.

The scene then cuts to the rubble that once was Fountain of Youth and Jennifer bemoaning its destruction. Just as a disgusted McCall walks away, an earthquake forms a large crevice, containing a huge fortune in gold, jewels and other rare artifacts. While he and several members of the Bigfoot team celebrate their discovery, Yank walks away, and Jennifer joins him as they drive into the sunset.

See also
 List of animated feature-length films

References

External links
 
 

1985 animated films
Television series by Marvel Productions
First-run syndicated television programs in the United States
Super Sunday (TV series)
Television series by Sunbow Entertainment
Television series created by Flint Dille
Television series by Claster Television
Toei Animation television